Plunge Creek is a stream in North Slope Borough, Alaska, in the United States. It is a tributary of Upikchak Creek.

Plunge Creek was so named from a nearby "plunging anticline".

See also
List of rivers of Alaska

References

Rivers of North Slope Borough, Alaska
Rivers of Alaska